The following lists events that happened during 2011 in the Republic of Equatorial Guinea.

Incumbents
President: Teodoro Obiang Nguema Mbasogo
Prime Minister: Ignacio Milam Tang

Events

July
 July 1 - An African Union summit is held in Malabo with many leaders showing annoyance to the NATO intervention in Libya due to fears of the situation becoming worse.

References

 
2010s in Equatorial Guinea
Years of the 21st century in Equatorial Guinea
Equatorial Guinea
Equatorial Guinea